Macotera is a village and municipality in the province of Salamanca, western Spain, part of the autonomous community of Castile-Leon.

See also
List of municipalities in Salamanca

References

External links
Ruidoso pleito entre Macotera y Santiago de la Puebla en el siglo XVI (exhumación del documento antiguo)
Diputación de Salamanca: Índice de municipios
Diputación de Salamanca: Macotera
Diputación de Salamanca: Datos de Macotera

Macotera en Google Maps

Municipalities in the Province of Salamanca